Sonic Team is a Japanese video game development division of Sega. The initial team was composed of developers from Sega's Consumer Development division, including programmer Yuji Naka, artist Naoto Ohshima, and level designer Hirokazu Yasuhara. The team took the name Sonic Team in 1991 with the release of Sonic the Hedgehog for the Sega Genesis. The game was a major success, and started the long-running Sonic the Hedgehog franchise.

The next several games were developed by Naka and Yasuhara in America at Sega Technical Institute. In late 1994, Naka returned to Japan to become the head of CS3, later renamed R&D #8. During this time, the division was branded with the Sonic Team name but also developed games that do not feature Sonic, such as Nights into Dreams (1996) and Burning Rangers (1998). Following the release of Sonic Adventure in 1998, some Sonic Team staff moved to the United States to form Sonic Team USA and develop Sonic Adventure 2 (2001). With Sega's diversification of its studios, R&D #8 became Sonic Team in 2000, with Naka as CEO and Sonic Team USA as its subsidiary. Sega's financial troubles led to several major structural changes in the early 2000s, the United Game Artists studio was absorbed by Sonic Team in 2003, and Sonic Team USA became Sega Studios USA in 2004. After Sammy Corporation purchased Sega in 2005, Sonic Team was restructured to become Sega's GE1 research and development department, and later, CS2. As of 2019, Sonic Team is a team within CS2.

In addition to the Sonic series, the company has developed other games for Sega, such as Nights into Dreams (1996) and Billy Hatcher and the Giant Egg (2003). The 1991 release of Sonic the Hedgehog is considered significant in video game history, as it increased the Sega Genesis's sales and Sega displaced Nintendo as the leading video game company. Some Sonic Team games, such as the Sonic games and Nights, are considered among the greatest of all time.

On this list, games are gathered that are either on the official Japanese Sonic Team website or titles where it is officially mentioned that Sonic Team is involved.

Games

See also

 List of Sega video games

Notes

References

 
Sonic the Hedgehog
Sonic Team
Sonic Team
Sonic Team